This is a list of WBC Muaythai world champions, showing every world champion certificated by the World Boxing Council Muaythai (WBC Muaythai). The WBC, which is one of the four major governing bodies in professional boxing, started certifying their own Muay Thai world champions in 19 different weight classes in 2005.

Super heavyweight (defunct)
Weight limit: Over 
Defunct since January 2021

Heavyweight 
Weight limit: Over 

Bridgerweight 
Weight limit: 

Cruiserweight 
Weight limit: 

Light heavyweight 
Weight limit:

Super middleweight 
Weight limit:

Middleweight 
Weight limit:

Super welterweight 
Weight limit:

Welterweight 
Weight limit:

Super lightweight 
Weight limit:

Lightweight 
Weight limit:

Super featherweight 
Weight limit:

Featherweight 
Weight limit:

Super bantamweight 
Weight limit:

Bantamweight 
Weight limit:

Super flyweight 
Weight limit:

Flyweight 
Weight limit:

Light flyweight 
Weight limit:

Mini flyweight 
Weight limit:

See also
List of IBF Muaythai world champions
List of WBC Muaythai diamond champions
List of WBC Muaythai female world champions
List of WBC Muaythai international champions
List of WBC Muaythai female international champions
List of WBC Muaythai international challenge winners
List of WBC Muaythai female international challenge winners

References

Lists of Muay Thai champions
WBC
Muaythai